The Arkansas State House of Representatives is the lower house of the Arkansas General Assembly, the state legislature of the US state of Arkansas. The House is composed of 100 members elected from an equal amount of constituencies across the state. Each district has an average population of 29,159 according to the 2010 federal census. Members are elected to two-year terms and, since the 2014 Amendment to the Arkansas Constitution, limited to sixteen years cumulative in either house.

The Arkansas House of Representatives meets annually, in regular session in odd number years and for a fiscal session in even number years, at the State Capitol in Little Rock.

History

During the Reconstruction era that followed the American Civil War, the Federal government passed the Reconstruction Acts and African Americans were enfranchised with voting rights. African Americans were elected and served in the Arkansas House although the numbers eventually declined as the Democrats retook control and were able to restore white supremacy. By the start of the 20th century African Americans were largely barred from holding in the Arkansas House and across the southern states.

Leadership of the House
The Speaker of the House presides over the body and is elected by the membership every two years. Its duties include the supervision and directing the daily order of business, recognizing members to speak, preserving order in the House, deciding all questions of order and germaneness, certifying all measures passed, assigning committee leadership, and naming members to select committees. In the Speaker's absence, the Speaker Pro Tempore presides.

Officers

Floor Leaders

Current composition

Current membership

Past composition of the House of Representatives

Committees
The House has 10 Standing Committees:

CLASS A
Education
Judiciary
Public Health, Welfare & Labor
Public Transportation
Revenue and Taxation

CLASS B
Aging, Children & Youth, Legislative & Military Affairs
Agriculture, Forestry & Economic Development
City, County and Local Affairs
Insurance and Commerce
State Agencies and Governmental Affairs

HOUSE SELECT COMMITTEES
Rules
House Management

JOINT COMMITTEES
Budget
Energy
Performance Review
Public Retirement and Social Security Programs
Advanced Communication and Information Technology

CURRENT COMMITTEES INCLUDE:

Advanced Communications And Information Technology
Aging, Children And Youth, Legislative & Military Affairs
Veterans' Home Task Force
House Leg., Military & Veterans  Affairs
House Children & Youth Subcom.
House Aging Subcommittee
Agriculture, Forestry & Economic Development
House Parks & Tourism Subcommittee
House Agriculture, Forestry & Natural Resources Subcom.
City, County & Local Affairs Committee
House Planning Subcommittee
House Local Government Personnel Subcommittee
House Finance Subcommittee
Education Committee
House K-12, Vocational-Technical Institutions Subcommittee
House Higher Education Subcommittee
House Early Childhood Subcommittee
House Management
House Rules
Insurance & Commerce
House Utilities Subcommittee
House Insurance Subcommittee
House Financial Institutions Subcommittee
Joint Performance Review
Judiciary Committee
House Juvenile Justice & Child Support Subcommittee
House Courts & Civil Law Subcommittee
House Corrections & Criminal Law Subcommittee
Public Health, Welfare And Labor Committee
House Labor & Environment  Subcommittee
House Human Services Subcommittee
House Health Services Subcommittee
Public Transportation
House Waterways & Aeronautics Subcom.
House  And Rail Subcommittee
House Motor Vehicle & Highways Subcom.
Revenue & Taxation
House Sales, Use, Misc. Taxes & Exemptions Subcom.
House Income Taxes-Personal & Corporate Subcom.
House Complaints And Remediation Subcom.
State Agencies & Govt'L Affairs
House State Agencies & Reorgan. Subcom
House Elections Subcommittee
House Constitutional Issues Subcommittee

Each Representative serves on two Standing Committees, and each committee has 20 members. Standing Committee chairmen and vice-chairmen are selected from respective committee rosters by the Speaker.

Two Select Committees operate exclusively within the House. Members of the committees are appointed by the Speaker. The House Select Committees are the House Committee on Rules and the House Management Committee.

The Committee on Rules considers all proposed action touching the House rules, the joint rules and the order of business. The Committee also considers all legislation dealing with alcohol, cigarettes, tobacco, tobacco products, coin-operated amusement devices, vending machines, lobbying, code of ethics, pari-mutuel betting and similar legislation.

The House Management Committee works with the Speaker of the House to direct and oversee operations of the House of Representatives. Its duties include the hiring and supervision of the House Staff, the development of personnel policies and procedures, and the monitoring of facility usage and maintenance.

Representatives also serve on five committees that operate jointly with the Senate. They are Joint Budget, Joint Retirement and Social Security Programs, Joint Energy, Joint Performance Review and Joint Committee on Advanced, Communications and Information Technology

House members of the Joint Budget Committee are chosen by their peers from respective caucus districts. House members on other Joint Committees are appointed to their positions by the Speaker.

History
John Wilson, the speaker of the Arkansas House of Representatives, stabbed Representative J. J. Anthony to death during a legislative debate on the floor of the chamber in 1837. Wilson was later acquitted. The Old State House is said to be haunted to this day.

In 1922, Frances Hunt became the first woman elected to a seat in the Arkansas General Assembly when she was elected to a seat in the Arkansas House of Representatives.

In 2020, several members tested positive for COVID-19 during the COVID-19 pandemic in Arkansas.

See also

Arkansas General Assembly
Arkansas Senate
Arkansas State Capitol

References

External links

 
Hou
Hou
State lower houses in the United States